Partanen is a Finnish surname. Notable people with the surname include:

Aku Partanen (born 1991), Finnish racewalker
Anu Partanen (born 1975), Finnish journalist
Heikki Partanen (1942–1990), Finnish film director and screenwriter
Iivari Partanen (1880–1947), Finnish gymnast
Jussiville Partanen (born 1991), Finnish ice dancer
Mika Partanen (born 1992), Finnish ice hockey player
Olli Partanen (1922–2014), Finnish discus thrower
Vaino Olavi Partanen (died 1969), Canadian Forces personnel and Cross of Valour recipient

Finnish-language surnames